Sallingsund Bridge (Sallingsundbroen) is a bridge that crosses Salling Sund between the island of Mors and the Salling peninsula on the mainland (Jylland (Jutland)) in Denmark. The bridge is 1717 metres long, the longest span is 93 metres, and the maximum clearance to the sea is 26 metres.

The building of Sallingsund Bridge started in 1973, and it was opened by Queen Margrethe II on 30 May 1978. Before the bridge was built, people and cars were taken across the sound by the ferries Pinen ("Pain") and Plagen ("Bother"). In 1976 a million passengers and a half million cars were ferried across the sound.

The bridge is pictured on the Danish 50-krone banknote since 2009.

See also
Vilsund Bridge, connecting Mors and Thy
List of bridges in Denmark
List of bridges

External links
The Sallingsund Bridge - Highways-Denmark.com
Another page about the bridge 
Another page about the bridge and the Salling Sund 
Pictures of Sallingsund Bridge
Picture and data about the bridge
Another picture of the bridge
http://home.no.net/lotsberg/data/danmark/bru.html
 

Bridges in Denmark
Beam bridges in Denmark
Road bridges in Denmark
Bridges completed in 1978
1978 establishments in Denmarka
Buildings and structures in Morsø Municipality
Buildings and structures in Skive Municipality
Limfjord